is a Japanese manufacturer of fine ceramics, known for its tableware products.

History 
Nikko was founded in 1908 in Kanazawa, Ishikawa by Lord Maeda and local nobles. The Maeda lords especially fostered arts and crafts, and made of Kanazawa a cultural center like Tokyo and Kyoto. The firm was famous for their ironstone ceramics, but Nikko has broadened its output since the 1970s.

Western materials such as bone china were introduced and developed using Nikko’s own advanced technologies. Today all aspects of production from glaze formulation to mould making are manufactured in-house by Nikko’s team of craftspeople. The resulting pieces are some of the finest quality ceramics in Japan.

Products
Nikko tableware collections include the Sensu, Blossom and Macaroon ranges, as well as the Blossom Lighting design.

References

External links

 Nikko Corporate website 
 Nikko Ceramics website 

Ceramics manufacturers of Japan
Japanese porcelain
Companies based in Ishikawa Prefecture
Design companies established in 1908
Manufacturing companies established in 1908
1908 establishments in Japan
Companies listed on the Nagoya Stock Exchange
Japanese brands